is a former Japanese football player.

Playing career
Yuhei Marumoto played for Fujieda MYFC in 2014 season.

References

External links

1991 births
Living people
Ryutsu Keizai University alumni
Association football people from Fukuoka Prefecture
Japanese footballers
J3 League players
Fujieda MYFC players
Association football midfielders